Deportes Concepción may refer to:
 Deportes Concepción (Chile)
 Deportes Concepción (Honduras)